The Dangerous Brothers was a stage and TV act by anarchic comedy duo Rik Mayall and Ade Edmondson, performing respectively as "Richard Dangerous" and "Sir Adrian Dangerous". Originally appearing on stage in London at the comedy club 'The Comic Strip', the characters were well developed before appearing on TV.  First appearing on television on a one-off 1980 BBC TV show 'Boom Boom Out Go The Lights', they were also featured in a TV short documentary film 'The Comic Strip', directed by Julien Temple, before they appeared in a number of brief sketches in the TV programme Saturday Live from 1985 and into its first series in 1986.

The act was, in essence, a prototype of the career which the pair were to forge over the next twenty years in such shows as Mr Jolly Lives Next Door; Filthy, Rich and Catflap; and Bottom - two low-life loser perverts hitting each other in spectacular slapstick ways.  It was arguably more hazardous than much of the material which was to follow in later incarnations - stage props in the brief run included a live crocodile, blank-firing submachine guns, and Edmondson apparently consuming Vim, a well-known UK brand of powder toilet cleaner.  One of the early TV sketches 'World of Danger' went wrong when a stunt to set fire to Edmondson's trousers left him with serious burns - although much of this was left on the broadcast version.

Sketch performed on 'BoomBoom Out Go The Lights'

 Knock Knock Joke / Gooseberry in a Lift

Sketch performed in 'The Comic Strip'

 Knock Knock Joke / Gooseberry in a Lift
(The Comic Strip version is a different performance with a slightly different conclusion, and features swearing)

Sketches performed on Saturday Live  
   
 World Of Danger (AKA The Towering Inferno)
 Big Stunt
 Torture - featuring Norman Lovett 
 Crocodile Snogging (which featured a live crocodile) and featuring John Bird
 Flying Zebra
 Exploding Politicians
 How To Get Off With A Lady - featuring Edmondson's wife Jennifer Saunders
 Babysitting - featuring Morwenna Banks as the wife and John Bird as the husband.
 Dangervision - featuring Hugh Laurie and Stephen Fry.
 Kinky Sex

One of the final sketches prepared for Saturday Live was entitled 'Kinky Sex'.  This fell foul of Channel 4 censors who banned it, the reason ended up getting the duo banned from Saturday Live for being "too sexy and too violent," despite that, the duo continues to have their last TV appearance on Saturday Live, the duo responded by apparently hijacking the programme and blowing up the wall on which the show's logo was painted in graffiti art along appearing on a "flower arranging dance" sketch with Hugh Laurie and Stephen Fry. The sketch, which by modern standards seems fairly tame, was finally released on a compilation video The Dangerous Brothers present:  World of Danger. Several Dangerous Brothers sketches are also included on the DVD compilation Saturday Live: The Best of Series One (2007).

Dangervision: The DVD
A DVD of all of the sketches featured in the show was released in 2009. However, the Kinky Sex episode is taken from a home video source as the original could not be found. Some of the sketches appear to be edited longer and slightly shorter than others. Music edits have also been made, of which some are obvious if you have seen the video. The laughing in the unseen audience is also different, where the video used the real studio audience laughter and also canned laughter. The DVD just uses the original studio audience.

English comedy duos